Inana is a village in Mundwa Tehsil in Nagaur district in the Indian state of Rajasthan. It belongs to the Ajmer division of Rajasthan. It is located 13 km east from district headquarters in Nagaur, 8 km from Mundwa main town and 232 km from state capital Jaipur. The postal code of Inana is 341026.

Demographics
In 2020, the population of Inana was 9,870, with 51.32% of the population male at 5,065 and 48.68% female at 4,805.

Marwari is the local language in Inana. Hindi and English are additionally spoken as the median of communication.

Transport
Marwar and Mundwa railway stations are the nearest to Inana, however, Nagaur and Ajmer railway stations are more major stations further nearby. The nearest airport is Kishangarh Airport in Ajmer.

References

Villages in Nagaur district